JeemTV, formerly known as Al Jazeera Children's Channel (abbreviated as JCC), is a Qatari pay television (formerly free-to-air until 2016) channel, aimed at kids between 7 and 12 years old. It was previously co-owned by Al Jazeera Media Network and the Qatar Foundation from launch until June 2013 when Al Jazeera fully acquired the channel. It was then acquired by beIN Media Group on April 1, 2016.

History
The channel was launched as JCC on September 9, 2005 as a joint venture between the Qatar Foundation (who owned 90% of the channel) and Al Jazeera Media Network (who owned the remaining 10%). The look was designed by Gédéon.

The first major rebrand for JCC happened on January 16, 2009, coinciding with the launch of sister channel Baraem. This time, Radiant Studios was in charge of the look for both channels, and were both met with positive reviews. London-based foundry Fontsmith revised the font used on air, which was depicted in the new logo, now in 2.5D. The age merit was changed from 3-15 to 7-15 as a result of the launch of Baraem. 
A European feed on Hotbird launched on November 1, 2012.

On February 12, 2013, a new look for JCC was announced on social media, along with that, a new website (whatisthedot.net, now redirects to jeemtv.net) was created detailing the new look, which was supposed to launch on March 1, but was later delayed. Finally, on March 29, 2013 at 5 pm Doha time, JCC was rebranded as JeemTV. The word "Jeem" is a reference to the letter  in the Arabic alphabet. It is depicted in the logo. The new logo was designed by Tarek Atrissi, while the on air look was made by Jump Design. Another change with this new look is the age merit, which changed from 7-15 to 7-12.

On June 15, 2013, three months after the rebranding to JeemTV, Al Jazeera announced the acquisition of the Qatar Foundation's assets of the channel, and would have full ownership of the channel since then.

On April 1, 2016, JeemTV and Baraem on Arabsat and Nilesat have both been encrypted in favour of HD feeds available exclusively via the beIN Channels Network service.

The European feed on Hotbird closed on June 1, 2018.

Programming
Content featuring children includes debate shows, educational programmes covering themes such as science, technology and sports, quizzes and game-shows, and cartoon and animation programmes. The channel produces some of its own cartoon TV series and other animations, such as My Arabian House, which premiered in 2007 and featured live action and puppetry. JeemTV also participates in co-productions with other public service children’s channels around the world. The remaining content consists of shows from the international market. Foreign-language material is translated into Arabic, either by voice-over, dubbing or by subtitles.

JeemTV developed its multimedia programme for learning and creativity with an interactive website. The website is bilingual in Arabic and English and provides more than 200 hours of educational and entertainment material. Members can also upload their images and videos and share them with other children around the world.

Since January 16, 2009, programming for the pre-school sector, aged 3 to 6 years old, is presented under the title Baraem.

Presenters and mascots

Human presenters
The channel has many presenters that host its programs. Some of the most popular presenters are Ashraf Al-Awadi (2005–present), Sahla Melki (2005-circa 2015), Jihane Arsanios (2005–present), Marwa Khamis (circa 2007–present), Mohamed Ali Bougma (2005-2013) and others.

Mascots and puppets
Since the channel's inception, the channel's mascot was a CGI robot named Nad who would appear in select shows, and was voiced by Ashraf Al-Awadi. He was retired in January 2009.

With the premiere of Allo Marhaba in 2007, a new mascot was introduced. This time he was a yellow puppet with black hair and was named Anbar. Unlike Nad however, Anbar continues to appear in the channel to this day.

Another puppet mascot was introduced sometime circa 2010, a red one with purple hair, named Lahouh, and would either accompany Anbar or appear on his own.

Broadcast
From launch to Summer 2007, JCC broadcast 18 hours a day on weekdays (6 am to 12 am Doha time) and 19 hours on weekends (6 am to 1 am). By the end of June 2007, JCC extends its broadcast time to 20 hours on weekdays (6 am to 2 am) and 21 hours on weekends (6 am to 3 am). With JCC's rebranding on January 16, 2009, the broadcast time was changed again, this time to 20 hours on both weekdays and weekends.

In September 2011, both JCC and Baraem started broadcasting in 16:9 aspect ratio in 720p resolution, coinciding with JCC's sixth anniversary.

In October 2012, the channel started broadcasting 24 hours a day.

JeemTV was free to view on Badr, Arabsat, Nilesat, Hotbird and Eurobird and was also distributed by a number of other operators across Europe. Although starting on April 1, 2016 it was made exclusive to beIN Channels Network, however, the Hot Bird feed remained free to view until June 1, 2018.

See also

Al Jazeera
beIN

References

External links
 JeemTV official website 
 JCC's website in 2012 (archived)
 JCC's website in 2008 (archived)

Television networks in Qatar
Children's television networks
Television channels and stations established in 2005
Foreign television channels broadcasting in the United Kingdom
2005 establishments in Qatar
Arabic-language television stations
Al Jazeera